Marcel Berré (12 November 1882 – 27 October 1957) was a Belgian fencer. He won a silver medal in the team foil competition at the 1924 Summer Olympics.

References

1882 births
1957 deaths
Belgian male fencers
Belgian foil fencers
Olympic fencers of Belgium
Fencers at the 1912 Summer Olympics
Fencers at the 1920 Summer Olympics
Fencers at the 1924 Summer Olympics
Olympic silver medalists for Belgium
Olympic medalists in fencing
Sportspeople from Antwerp
Medalists at the 1924 Summer Olympics
20th-century Belgian people